Fabrizio Ferron (born 5 September 1965 in Bollate) is a former Italian footballer who played as a goalkeeper. He played over 300 games in Serie A.

Football career
Ferron started his career with the A.C. Milan youth team. He then played for Sambenedettese, before spending 8 seasons at Atalanta.

On 23 February 1992, Ferron suffered the infamy of conceding a late equaliser to Michelangelo Rampulla, the opposing goalkeeper for Cremonese, who became the first goalkeeper to score from open play in Serie A history.

In a 0–3 loss away to Reggiana on 23 January 1994, Ferron's heart stopped beating for some 15 seconds after a collision with an opposing striker. Luckily, he was revived shortly afterwards.

He then played for Sampdoria, and subsequently for Internazionale, as a backup to Angelo Peruzzi.

He joined Verona in summer 2000. In summer 2002, he joined Serie A newcomer Como, where he competed with Alex Brunner for a starting spot. Due to Brunner's departure and the club's relegation, he became the regular starter for Como, ahead of Stefano Layeni. In the summer of 2004, he joined Bologna as a backup to Gianluca Pagliuca, who was one year younger than Ferron.

Style of play
An experienced and well-rounded goalkeeper, Ferron was known for his composed and efficient style of goalkeeping. He possessed good intuition and a strong positional sense, and was also known for his athleticism, agility, shot-stopping, punching ability, and reflexes, which enabled him to produce spectacular dives and acrobatic saves when necessary, without having to resort to histrionics; moreover, he stood out for his consistency throughout his career, and was considered one of the most reliable goalkeepers in Serie A during the 1990s.

Honours
Atalanta
Serie A promotion: 1994–95
Coppa Italia Runner-up: 1995–96

Inter
Coppa Italia Runner-up: 1999–2000

References

External links

Inter Archive

1965 births
Living people
People from Bollate
Italian footballers
A.C. Milan players
Atalanta B.C. players
U.C. Sampdoria players
Inter Milan players
Hellas Verona F.C. players
Como 1907 players
Bologna F.C. 1909 players
Serie A players
Serie B players
Association football goalkeepers
Footballers from Lombardy
Sportspeople from the Metropolitan City of Milan